Kim Young-sun ( born on 5 March 1971) is a South Korean actress. She made her acting debut in 2005 in films, since then, she has appeared in number of plays, films and television series. She got recognition for her supporting roles in Boys Over Flowers (2009), Shine or Go Crazy (2015), and Twenty-Five Twenty-One (2022). She has acted in films such as: The Piper (2015), A Man and a Woman (2016) and Psychokinesis (2018) among others.

Career
Kim Young-sun is affiliated to artist management company Hunus Entertainment since February 2022.

It was her childhood dream to become an actor, so Kim acted in Busan Municipal Youth Theater since her middle school days. After graduation from school she worked in a bank.  In beginning she was majorly active in the theater and stage but later on she appeared in TV series and films.

Filmography

Films

Television series

Theater

Ambassadorship 
 Public Relations Ambassador for the 2022 Seoul International Senior Film Festival held from May 19 to May 23 at CGV Piccadilly 1958 Hall 3.

References

External links

 
 
 Kim Young-sun on Daum 
 Kim Young-sun on Play DB

21st-century South Korean actresses
South Korean film actresses
South Korean television actresses
South Korean stage actresses
Living people
1971 births